The La Liga is a Spanish professional league for association football club. At the top of the Spanish football league system, it is the country's primary football competition and is contested by 20 clubs. The competition was formed in 1929, with an initial format of 10
teams.

League records

Records in this section refer to La Liga from its founding in 1929 through to the present.

Titles
 Most league titles: 35, Real Madrid (1931–32, 1932–33, 1953–54, 1954–55, 1956–57, 1957–58, 1960–61, 1961–62, 1962–63, 1963–64, 1964–65, 1966–67, 1967–68, 1968–69, 1971–72, 1974–75, 1975–76, 1977–78, 1978–79, 1979–80, 1985–86, 1986–87, 1987–88, 1988–89, 1989–90, 1994–95, 1996–97, 2000–01, 2002–03, 2006–07, 2007–08, 2011–12, 2016–17, 2019–20, 2021–22)
 Most consecutive league titles: 5, Real Madrid (twice): (1961 to 1965 and 1986 to 1990)

Top-flight appearances
 Most appearances: 92, joint record (up to 2022–23)
 Athletic Bilbao (1929–present)
 Barcelona (1929–present)
 Real Madrid (1929–present)

Wins
 Most wins overall: 1,767 – Real Madrid
 Most wins in a season: 32, Real Madrid (2011–12) and Barcelona (2012–13)
 Most home wins in a season: 18, Real Madrid (1987–88 and 2009–10) and Barcelona (2009–10)
 Most away wins in a season: 16, Real Madrid (2011–12)
 Most consecutive wins: 16, Barcelona (2010–11) and Real Madrid (2016–17)
 Most consecutive home wins: 39, Barcelona (16 February 1958 to 6 November 1960)
 Most consecutive away wins: 13, Real Madrid (26 February 2017 to 14 October 2017)
Most consecutive wins on season's opening matchday: 10, Barcelona (2009–10 to 2018–19) 
 Fewest wins in a season: 2, joint record:
 Sporting Gijón (1997–98): final record P38 W2 D7 L29
 Logroñés (1994–95): final record P38 W2 D9 L27
 Celta Vigo (1943–44): final record P26 W2 D5 L19
 Real Betis (1942–43): final record P26 W2 D6 L18
 100% home win record in a season:
 Athletic Bilbao (9 games, 1933–34)
 Athletic Bilbao (11 games, 1935–36)
 Barcelona (13 games, 1948–49)
 Barcelona (15 games, 1952–53)
 Sevilla (15 games, 1956–57)
 Barcelona (15 games, 1958–59)
 Barcelona (15 games, 1959–60)
 Real Madrid (15 games, 1959–60)
 Real Madrid (15 games, 1962–63)
 Real Madrid (17 games, 1985–86)
 Longest win streak from the start of a season: 9, Real Madrid (1968–69)

Draws
 Most draws overall: 698 – Athletic Bilbao
 Most draws in a season: 18, Deportivo La Coruña (2015–16)
 Most consecutive draws: 9, Burgos (30 April 1978 to 28 October 1978)

Losses
 Most losses overall: 1,135 – Espanyol
 Most losses in a season: 29, Sporting Gijón (1997–98)
 Most consecutive losses in a season: 11, Las Palmas (13 December 1959 to 28 February 1960)
 Most consecutive losses at home: 9, Córdoba (24 January 2015 to ongoing)
 Most consecutive losses away: 25, Hércules (11 September 1955 to 26 February 1967)
 Fewest losses in a season: 0, (18 games season) joint record:
 Athletic Bilbao (1929–30; final record P18 W12 D6 L0)
 Real Madrid (1931–32; final record P18 W10 D8 L0)
 Fewest losses in a season under current league format (38 games): 1, joint record:
 Real Madrid (1988–89; final record P38 W25 D12 L1)
 Barcelona (2009–10; final record P38 W31 D6 L1)
 Barcelona (2017–18; final record P38 W28 D9 L1)
 Fewest home losses in a season: 0, joint record:
 Almería (1979–80)
 Athletic Bilbao (1929–30, 1931–32, 1933–34, 1935–36, 1952–53, 1955–56, 1975–76, 1977–78)
 Atlético Madrid (1939–40, 1940–41, 1945–46, 1947–48, 1950–51, 1960–61, 1961–62, 1962–63, 1970–71, 1974–75, 1975–76, 1982–83, 2013–14)
 Barcelona (1947–48, 1948–49, 1950–51, 1952–53, 1956–57, 1958–59, 1959–60, 1961–62, 1967–68, 1973–74, 1974–75, 1975–76, 1984–85, 1992–93, 2006–07, 2009–10, 2012–13, 2017–18)
 Celta Vigo (1947–48, 1954–55, 1970–71)
 Córdoba (1964–65)
 Deportivo La Coruña (1949–50, 1954–55)
 Espanyol (1948–49, 1963–64)
 Granada (1971–72)
 Hércules (1954–55)
 Las Palmas (1954–55, 1967–68)
 Osasuna (1957–58)
 Oviedo (1933–34, 1944–45, 1990–91)
 Pontevedra (1967–68)
 Racing Santander (1931–32, 1933–34)
 Real Betis (1934–35, 1983–84)
 Real Madrid (1931–32, 1944–45, 1945–46, 1949–50, 1951–52, 1957–58, 1958–59, 1959–60, 1960–61, 1961–62, 1962–63, 1963–64, 1966–67, 1968–69, 1971–72, 1974–75, 1977–78, 1978–79, 1979–80, 1981–82, 1985–86, 1988–89, 1989–90, 1991–92, 1992–93, 1996–97, 2001–02, 2012–13, 2019–20)
 Real Sociedad (1929, 1950–51, 1974–75, 1976–77, 1979–80, 1981–82, 2002–03)
 Sevilla (1940–41, 1950–51, 1951–52, 1956–57, 1980–81)
 Valencia (1931–32, 1940–41, 1948–49, 1957–58, 1961–62, 1979–80)
 Zaragoza (1961–62, 1964–65, 1967–68, 1974–75)

Points
 Most points overall in the top flight: 4,786 – Real Madrid
 Most points in a season overall: 100, (87.72% of points), Real Madrid (2011–12), Barcelona (2012–13)
 Most points in a season at home: 55, Barcelona (2009–10 and 2012–13) 
 
 Most points in a season opening half: 55, Barcelona (2012–13)
 
 Most points in a season (2 points for a win, 18 games): 30, Athletic Bilbao (1929–30)
 Most points in a season (2 points for a win, 22 games): 34, Real Betis (1934–35)
 Most points in a season (2 points for a win, 26 games): 40, Valencia (1941–42 and 1943–44)
 Most points in a season (2 points for a win, 30 games): 52, Real Madrid (1960–61)
 Most points in a season (2 points for a win, 34 games): 56, Real Madrid (1985–86)
 Most points in a season (2 points for a win, 38 games): 62, Real Madrid (1987–88, 1988–89 and 1989–90)
 Most points in a season (2 points for a win, 44 games): 66, Real Madrid (1986–87)
 Most points in a season (3 points for a win, 42 games): 92, Real Madrid (1996–97)
 Most points in a season (3 points for a win, 38 games): 100, Real Madrid (2011–12), Barcelona (2012–13)
 Fewest points in a season (2 points for a win): 9, Celta Vigo (1943–44) final record P26 W2 D5 L19
 Fewest points in a season (3 points for a win): 13, Sporting Gijón (1997–98) final record P38 W2 D7 L29

Games without a loss
 Most consecutive league games without a loss: 43, Barcelona (8 April 2017 to 13 May 2018)
 Most consecutive home league games without a loss: 121, Real Madrid (17 February 1957 to 7 March 1965)
 Most consecutive away league games without a loss: 23, Barcelona (14 February 2010 to 30 April 2011)

Games without a win
 Most consecutive league games without a win: 26, Levante (18 April 2021 to 20 December 2021)
 Most consecutive league games without a win away: 72, Hércules (8 December 1940 to 12 March 1967)

Games without scoring
 Most consecutive league games without scoring: 8, joint record:
 Sabadell (27 September 1987 to 6 December 1987)
 Castellón (28 October 1990 to 6 January 1991)
 Most consecutive league games without scoring at home: 7, Athletic Bilbao (6 January 1996 to 7 April 1996)
 Most consecutive league games without scoring away: 12, Deportivo La Coruña (17 January 1965 to 4 December 1966)
 Most consecutive league games without scoring away in a single season: 11, Hércules (17 November 2010 to 3 April 2011)

Games without conceding a goal
 Most consecutive league games without conceding a goal: 13, Atlético Madrid (2 December 1990 to 17 March 1991)
 Most consecutive league games without conceding a goal home: 12, Barcelona (23 April 2011 to 15 January 2012)
 Most consecutive league games without conceding a goal away: 7, Barcelona (1 November 1986 to 7 February 1987)
 Most games without conceding a goal in a season: 26, Deportivo La Coruña (1993–94)
 Most consecutive clean sheets from the start of a season: 8, Barcelona (2014–15)

Appearances
 Most career league appearances: 622, Andoni Zubizarreta
 Most career league appearances at one club: 550, Raúl (for Real Madrid)
 Most career league appearances by a foreign player: 520, Lionel Messi 
 Most consecutive league appearances: 251, Iñaki Williams (20 April 2016 to 29 January 2023) 
 Oldest player: Ricardo, 41 years, 5 months and 2 days (for Osasuna v. Real Madrid, 1 June 2013)
 Oldest player under exceptional circumstances: Harry Lowe, 48 years, 7 months and 12 days (for Real Sociedad v. Valencia, 24 March 1935) (Real Sociedad's manager played due to a player down to illness, the team did not bring any substitutes to the away game for financial reasons.)
 Youngest player: Luka Romero, 15 years, 219 days (for Mallorca v. Real Madrid, 24 June 2020)

Goals

Team records
 Most league goals scored in a season: 121, Real Madrid (2011–12)
 Most home league goals scored in a season: 78, Real Madrid (1989–90)
 Most away league goals scored in a season: 58, Real Madrid (2016–17)
 Most games scored in a season: 38 (scoring in every game in a single La Liga season), Barcelona (2012–13), Real Madrid (2016–17)
 
 
 Fewest away league goals scored in a season: 2, Deportivo La Coruña (1964–65)
 Most league goals conceded in a season: 134, Lleida (1950–51)
 
 Fewest league goals conceded in a season at the current format (38 game season): 18, joint record Deportivo La Coruña (1993-1994) & Atlético Madrid (2015-2016)
 Fewest league goals conceded home in a season: 2, joint record: 	

 Best conceded goal quota in a season:

 Best goal difference in a season: +89, Real Madrid (2011–12), Barcelona (2014–15)
 Worst goal difference in a season: –93, Lleida (1950–51)
 Most consecutive games scoring: 64, Barcelona (4 February 2012 to 5 October 2013)
 
 
 
 
 Most goalscorers in a season: 22, Barcelona (2021–22)

Individual records                                                                                                                                                                                                                                                                                       

Most career league goals: 474, Lionel Messi
 Most goals scored in a season: 50, Lionel Messi (2011–12) 
Most career league assists: 192, Lionel Messi
Most assists made in a season: 21, Lionel Messi (2019–20)
 Most league goals scored in a calendar year: 59, Lionel Messi (2012)
 Most league home goals in a season (38 games, 19 home games): 35, Lionel Messi (2011–12)
 Most league away goals in a season (38 games, 19 away games): 24, Lionel Messi (2012–13)
 Most career La Liga matches scored in: 300, Lionel Messi (2004-2021)
Most league matches scored in a season (38 games): 27, Lionel Messi (2012–13)
Most league home matches scored in a season (38 games): 16, Lionel Messi (2011–12)
Most league away matches scored in a season (38 games): 15, Lionel Messi (2012–13)
 Most opponents scored against in La Liga history: 38, Lionel Messi
 Most opponents scored against in a season: 19, joint record:
Ronaldo for Barcelona (1996–97) (42 games)
Cristiano Ronaldo for Real Madrid (2011–12) (38 games)
Lionel Messi for Barcelona (2012–13) (38 games)
 Fastest to score 20 La Liga goals in a single season: 12 games, Cristiano Ronaldo (2014–15)
 
 Fastest to 100 La Liga goals: 82 games, Isidro Lángara (for Oviedo (matchday 2, 28 September 1947, season 1947–48)
 Fastest to 150 La Liga goals: 140 games, Cristiano Ronaldo (matchday 5, 22 September 2013, season 2013–14)
 Fastest to 200 La Liga goals: 178 games, Cristiano Ronaldo
 Fastest to 250 La Liga goals: 228 games, Cristiano Ronaldo
 Fastest to 300 La Liga goals: 286 games, Cristiano Ronaldo
 Most consecutive hat-tricks in one season: 3, Isidro Lángara (for Oviedo (1934–35))
 Most goals scored in a game: 7, joint record:
 Agustín Sauto Arana (for Athletic Bilbao v. Barcelona, 8 February 1931)
 László Kubala (for Barcelona v. Sporting Gijón, 10 February 1952)
 Most consecutive league appearances scored in: 21, Lionel Messi (33 goals, from matchday 11 to matchday 34, season 2012–13)
 Most consecutive home league matches scored in: 18, Mariano Martín (37 goals, from matchday 22 season 1941–42 to matchday 6 season 1943–44)
 Most consecutive away league matches scored in: 13, Lionel Messi (20 goals from matchday 8 to matchday 33, season 2012–13)
 Most hat-tricks scored in La Liga history: 36, Lionel Messi
 Most league hat-tricks scored in a season: 8, joint record:
 Lionel Messi (2011–12)
 Cristiano Ronaldo (2014–15)
 Most braces (2-goal matches) scored in La Liga history: 116, Lionel Messi 
 Fastest hat-trick in La Liga: 4 minutes and 43 seconds, Bebeto (for Deportivo La Coruña v. Albacete in 1995)
 Youngest player to score a hat-trick in La Liga: 19 years and 139 days, Yeremi Pino (for Villarreal CF v. RCD Espanyol, 27 February 2022)
Oldest player to score a hat-trick in La Liga: 39 years and 241 days, Jorge Molina (for Granada v. Mallorca, 19 December 2021)
Most goals scored from direct free kicks: 39, Lionel Messi
 Most goals from penalties in La Liga history: 61, Cristiano Ronaldo
 Most penalties taken in La Liga history: 73, Lionel Messi 
 Youngest player to score 200 league goals: 25 years and 7 months, Lionel Messi (27 January 2013) 
 Youngest goalscorer: Fabrice Olinga, 16 years and 98 days (for Málaga v. Celta Vigo, 18 August 2012)
Most Pichichi awards (La Liga top goalscorer): 8, Lionel Messi
 Most La Liga Best Player awards: 6, Lionel Messi
 Most La Liga Best Forward awards: 7, Lionel Messi
 Only player to score 30+ goals in 8 different seasons: Lionel Messi (2004–2021)  
 Only player to score 4 goals (super hat-tricks) in 2 consecutive matches in La Liga history in a single season: 2, Luis Suárez (matchdays 34 and 35, season 2015–16)
 Only players to be involved in 7 goals in a single match in La Liga history: joint record: 
Agustín Sauto Arana (for Athletic Bilbao vs Barcelona, 8 February 1931)
László Kubala (for Barcelona v. Sporting Gijón, 10 February 1952)
Luis Suárez, (for Barcelona v. Deportivo de La Coruña, 20 April 2016)
Most opening goals in La Liga history: 103, Lionel Messi
Most stadiums scored at in La Liga history: 36, Lionel Messi
Most wins in La Liga history: 383, Lionel Messi

Goalkeepers' records 
 Most penalties saved: 22, Diego Alves for Almería and Valencia
 Most penalties saved in a single season: 6, Diego Alves for Valencia, 2016–17
 Most clean sheets in a season: 26, Francisco Liaño (for Deportivo La Coruña, 1993–94)
Best conceded goal quota in a season:
1 – 0.474 goals per game (18 goals in 38 matches), Francisco Liaño (for Deportivo La Coruña, 1993–94), Jan Oblak (for Atlético Madrid, 2015–16)
3 – 0.5 goals per game (16 goals in 32 matches), Víctor Valdés (for Barcelona, 2010–11)
4 – 0.51 goals per game (19 goals in 37 matches), Claudio Bravo (for Barcelona, 2014–15)
 Most clean sheets: 233, Andoni Zubizarreta (66 for Athletic Bilbao, 123 for Barcelona and 44 for Valencia, 1981–1998)
 Longest start to a season with no goals conceded: 754 minutes, Claudio Bravo (for Barcelona, 2014–15)
 Longest goalkeeping run without conceding a goal: 1,275 minutes, Abel Resino (for Atlético Madrid, 1990–91)

Scorelines
 Record win: Athletic Bilbao 12–1 Barcelona (8 February 1931)
 Record away win: 0–8, on four occasions:
 Las Palmas 0–8 Barcelona (25 October 1959)
 Almería 0–8 Barcelona (20 November 2010)
 Córdoba 0–8 Barcelona (2 May 2015)
 Deportivo La Coruña 0–8 Barcelona (20 April 2016)
 Most goals in a game: 14, Athletic Bilbao 9–5 Racing Santander (5 February 1933)
 Highest scoring draw: 12, Atlético Madrid 6–6 Athletic Bilbao (29 January 1950)

Disciplinary
 Most red cards in a single match: 6,
 
 Most red cards (individual): 20, Sergio Ramos
 Most yellow cards (individual): 171, Sergio Ramos

Club records

Most points in a La Liga season (at least 90 points)

Most goals in a La Liga season (at least 100 goals)

 Most goals in a season not including Real Madrid or Barcelona: 88 in 30 matches by Athletic Bilbao (1950–51).

Most goals in a season – all competitions (at least 150 goals)

 First team to score at least 100 goals in a season: Valencia in 1941–42 (111 in 34 matches).
 A number of teams managed to score over 100 goals in a season during the 1930s, when the national league and cup were played alongside the regional leagues. Most prolific among those was the Athletic Bilbao team of the early 1930s, who scored 126 goals in 1929–30, 137 goals in 1930–31, 127 goals in 1931–32, 127 goals in 1932–33 and 115 goals in 1933–34; others include Oviedo, who scored 114 goals in 1933–34 and 110 goals in 1935–36.
 Most goals in a season (all competitions) besides Real Madrid and Barcelona: Sevilla in 2014–15 (119 in 60 matches).

Most effective team in a La Liga season (at least 3 goals per match)

Individual records

Most championships won
Spanish
 12, Francisco Gento (all with Real Madrid)

Non-Spanish
 10, Lionel Messi (all with Barcelona)

Goalscoring

Top 30 goalscorers

Players in bold are still active in La Liga. Players in italics are still active outside La Liga.

Top 5 goalscorers, still active in La Liga (La Liga only)

Most hat-tricks in the League (at least 10)
Three or more goals in a single match.
For the complete list of hat-tricks see List of La Liga hat-tricks.

Players in bold are still active in La Liga. Players in italics are still active outside La Liga.

Players with at least 10 hat-tricks are shown in this table.

Source: BDFútbol

Most goals in a La Liga season (at least 35 goals)

Bold player name denotes current season.

Most goals in a season — all competitions (at least 50 goals)

Bold player name denotes current season.

Goalkeeping

Top 5 longest goalkeeping runs without conceding a goal, all-time (Primera División only)

Most appearances

Top 30 most appearances, all-time (Primera División)

Players in bold are still active in La Liga. Players in italics are still active outside La Liga.

Top 5 most appearances, still active (Primera División)

Coaches

Coaches with most matches won

Coaches in bold are still active in La Liga.

Coaches with most matches managed

Coaches in bold are still active in La Liga.

All-time table
The all-time La Liga table is an overall record of all match results, points, and goals of every team that has played in La Liga since its inception in 1929. The table is accurate as of the end of the 2021–22 season. Teams in bold are part of the 2022–23 La Liga season.

References

Further reading 
 Martínez Calatrava, Vicente (2002). Historia y estadística del fúbol español. De la Olimpiada de Amberes a la Guerra Civil (1920–1939). 
 Martínez Calatrava, Vicente (2002). Historia y estadística del fútbol español. De la Guerra Civil al Mundial de Brasil (1939–1950). 
 Martínez Calatrava, Vicente (2002). Historia y estadística del fútbol español. Del gol de Zarra al gol de Marcelino (1950–1964). 
 Martínez Calatrava, Vicente (2002). Historia y estadística del fútbol español. Del Campeonato de Europa al Mundial de España (1964–1982). 
 Martínez Calatrava, Vicente (2002). Historia y estadística del fútbol español. Del Mundial 82 a la final española de París (1982–2001).

External links
Liga de Fútbol Profesional - Historical football data provided by the official Spanish league webpage
hesgoal website 

La Liga records and statistics
Spanish football club statistics
Spanish records
All-time football league tables